Santo Domingo is a municipality in the Chontales Department of Nicaragua. It has a population of 14,343, with about half of the population living in an urban zone. 

Municipalities of the Chontales Department